Kaushalya "Kitu" Gidwani is an Indian actress and model. She has starred in several movies and serials on Indian television.
 
Kitu played the role of Svetlana in Swabhimaan which brought recognition for her. Then she signed Shaktimaan and played the role of "Geeta Vishwas", a news channel reporter who stand for the truth. She left the show after a few episodes and later became popular after a TV series, Air Hostess aired on Doordarshan in 1986, and received critical acclaim for her roles in  Dance of the Wind (1997), Deepa Mehta's Earth (1998), Govind Nihalani's Rukhmavati Ki Haveli (1991), Kamal Haasan's Abhay and Deham (2001).

Early and personal life

Gidwani was born in Mumbai. Her Sindhi parents migrated from Pakistan after the partition. They lived in a refugee camp in Worli. She has a brother.

She studied in Fort Convent School, Mumbai. Her post graduation days saw her interest in French and she started acting in French plays. Soon she was acting in English plays directed by Janak Toprani. She acted in some television serials and subsequently acted in a French film Black (1987), playing a Brazilian girl in it.

Acting career
Gidwani made her television debut in 1984 on the TV soap Trishna, and during the 1980s and '90s, gave some memorable performances in TV serials like Swabhimaan, Air Hostess and Junoon. She caught a lot of attention after her kissing scene in bed with actor Tom Alter in Junoon. In 1997, she was doing four serials at one time, besides Swabhimaan and Junoon, she was also acting in Saahil, Yeh Kahan Aa Gaye Hum. She recently appeared in multi-starrer Hindi serials Kaashish and Kulvadhu.

In 1997, she played the role of a Hindustani classical singer, Pallavi, who struggles to get her voice back after losing her mentor/mother, in Dance of the Wind. The role won her Best Actress Award at Three Continents Festival, Nantes. In Pankaj Butalia's Shadows in the Dark she played Lajma, a middle-aged woman living in present-day Pakistan. In the 2010s she played small roles in  Fashion, Dhobi Ghat and Student of the Year.

In 2001, in conjunction with Wills Lifestyle, an apparel chain owned by ITC Limited, she promoted Wills Sport Lifestyle brand of clothing. In 2006, she also acted in a play, Your Place or Mine by Darshan Jariwala.

She also did a play, Sock ’em With Honey, where she played a traditional Parsi woman from Pakistan, whose daughter falls in love with a Jew, prompting her first trip abroad.

Awards
In 1998, Kitu won the Best Actress Award at the Three Continents Festival, Nantes, France. The award recognized her outstanding achievement for the role of Pallavi in Dance of the Wind (directed by Rajan Khosa).

Filmography

References

External links

 
 

Living people
Actresses in Hindi cinema
Actresses in Tamil cinema
Indian film actresses
Female models from Mumbai
Indian stage actresses
Indian television actresses
Sindhi people
Actresses from Mumbai
20th-century Indian actresses
21st-century Indian actresses
Actresses in Hindi television
1967 births